Shinnick is a surname. Notable people with the surname include:

Don Shinnick (1935-2004), American football player
Pete Shinnick (born 1965), American football coach and former player
Phil Shinnick (born 1943), American track and field athlete
Thomas Shinnick (1833-?), American politician
Tim Shinnick (1867–1944), American baseball player